Louisa Lander (1826–1923) was a member of the expatriate community of American women sculptors who settled in Rome in the mid-nineteenth century, led by Charlotte Cushman and Harriet Hosmer. Lander was ostracized from this community in 1859 due to a rumored personal scandal, and many of the details of her later life remain unknown.

Early life 

(Maria) Louisa Lander was born in 1826 in Salem, Massachusetts, to a privileged New England family. She was the great-granddaughter of Elias Hasket Derby, and her grandfather on her mother's side was a relative of the painter Benjamin West. Her father was a ship captain, and her brother, Col. Frederick W. Lander, explored the American west. Her family home in Danvers, Massachusetts was decorated with carvings by the Skillin brothers and Samuel McIntire, and she studied these works to fuel her artistic ambitions. She began carving and modeling in wood, alabaster, and sealing wax, and worked professionally as a cameo carver in her early career. By 1855, she had her own studio in Salem, where she produced portraits and ideal busts.

Expatriate in Rome 
In 1855, at the age of nineteen, Lander went to Rome, where she joined the circle of American women expatriate artists that included Harriet Hosmer, Anne Whitney, Edmonia Lewis, and Emma Stebbins, a group satirized by novelist Henry James as the "white marmorean flock."  She immediately sought out the American sculptor Thomas Crawford, whose work she had studied during visits to the Boston Athenaeum. Impressed with her work, Crawford took her on as a student and assistant, and she studied with him for a little over a year before his untimely death in 1857.

After Crawford's death, Lander established her own studio. Here she began a life-sized sculpture of Virginia Dare, who was the first child born of English parents in the Americas and who disappeared with her parents in the mystery of the Lost Colony of Roanoke Island. While there is no evidence that the child survived, one persistent theory has suggested that the colonists of Roanoke were absorbed into the local Indian population, and Lander depicted Dare as an adult Indian princess. Lander's Dare is in the tradition of the captivity narrative, a genre in American art and literature of the nineteenth century that depicted white Euro-American women as the captives of Native Americans or other non-white populations. Other American sculptures from this period in the same tradition included Hiram Powers' Greek Slave (1843) and Erastus Dow Palmer's White Captive (1859). But unlike the passive victims depicted by Powers and Palmer, Lander's Dare seems to embrace her alternate lifestyle. As Melissa Dabakis has suggested, the "partial nudity, competing identities, and implied sexual violence" of the sculpture may have contributed to its cool reception. Lander completed the plaster version of Virginia Dare in 1859 and the marble in 1860.

Reception of Virginia Dare may also have been colored by a personal scandal that negatively impacted Lander's standing in the circle of American artists in Rome. Among her patrons was fellow Salemite Nathaniel Hawthorne, who sat for a portrait bust. Hawthorne was quite taken with her, and Lander became close to the entire Hawthorne family, often accompanying the family or Hawthorne alone on tourist outings around Rome. Critics have made the case that one or both of the two female artists in Hawthorne's work, The Marble Faun (1860), could be based on Louisa Lander, given their relationship. But late in 1858, the relationship between Lander and the Hawthornes soured. In June of that year, Lander made a trip home to Boston to promote her statues of Evangeline and Virginia Dare. When she returned to Rome in November, the Hawthornes refused to see her. During that time, rumors had circulated that Lander had, in her cousin John Rogers' words, "lived on uncommonly good terms with some man here," or that she had posed as a nude model. As a result of these rumors, Lander was ostracized from the American expatriate community in Rome.

Later life 
Lander returned to Boston on April 1, 1860, and took a studio on Tremont Street. She was warmly received by the Boston art world, and she was able to recuperate her damaged career. In May 1861, after the outbreak of the American Civil War, she moved to Washington, DC, and volunteered as a nurse in local hospitals, where she also continued to pursue her sculptural career. Little is known of her life after the 1870s.

Selected works 

Evangeline (1856-1858)
Nathaniel Hawthorne, Concord Free Library, Concord, Massachusetts
Virginia Dare (1859), Elizabethan Gardens, Roanoke, North Carolina
Undine (c. 1861)
Evangeline (exhibited at the Düsseldorf Gallery, New York City)
Elizabeth, the exile of Siberia
Ceres Mourning for Proserpine

Notes

References 
 Ellet, Elizabeth. Women Artists in All Ages and Countries. 1859.
 Gardner, Albert T. E. Yankee Stonecutters. 1800–1850.
 Herbert, T. Walter. Dearest Beloved: The Hawthornes and the Making of the Middle-Class Family. 1995. 
 Prieto, Laura R. At Home in the Studio: The Professionalization of Women Artists in America. 2001.
 Rubinstein, Charlotte Streifer.  American Women Sculptors. 1990.
 Louisa Lander. (1861). Louisa Lander. Cosmopolitan Art Journal, 5(1), 26–28.

1826 births
1923 deaths
Artists from Salem, Massachusetts
19th-century American sculptors
American women sculptors
Sculptors from Massachusetts
19th-century American women artists
20th-century American sculptors
20th-century American women artists